Klaudia Breś (born 22 June 1994) is a Polish sport shooter. She represented her country at the 2016 Summer Olympics. She won gold medal at the 2019 10m European Shooting Championships.

References 

1994 births
Living people
Polish female sport shooters
Shooters at the 2016 Summer Olympics
Olympic shooters of Poland
Sportspeople from Bydgoszcz
European Games competitors for Poland
Shooters at the 2015 European Games
Shooters at the 2019 European Games
Shooters at the 2020 Summer Olympics
21st-century Polish women